"Pressure Down" is a song written by Harry Bogdanovs, recorded by Australian singer John Farnham. The song was released as the second single from his album Whispering Jack (1986)

Reception
Cash Box magazine called it "A summers breeze of a pop tune, with razor-sharp production."

Charts

Weekly charts

Year-end charts

References

1986 singles
1986 songs
APRA Award winners
John Farnham songs